The 2002–03 season was Bristol City Football Club's 105th season in English football, and their fourth consecutive season in the Second Division. It was Danny Wilson's third year in charge of the club since his arrival in July 2000. A third place saw Bristol City reach the play-offs, but a 1–0 defeat to Cardiff City in the semi-finals, ended their hopes of league promotion. However, the club saw some success, after reaching the final in the Football League Trophy, where they beat Carlisle United 2–0, but failed to repeat this throughout the rest of the season, as they exited in the third round of the FA Cup, losing to Leicester City, and the first round of the League Cup against Oxford United.

The club's leading goalscorer was Scott Murray, with 27 goals in all competitions.

Player details

Squad information

Final league table

Matches

Pre-season

Second Division

Play-offs

Cardiff City won 1–0 on aggregate.

FA Cup

League Cup

Bristol City entered the first round of the League Cup, where they were drawn against Oxford United.

Football League Trophy

References

External links
 2002–03 Bristol City  on statto.com

Bristol City
Bristol City F.C. seasons